The women's division of the 2022 PNVF Champions League began on November 6 to 13, 2022 at PhilSports Arena, Pasig City, Philippines. This is the second edition of the PNVF Champions League.

California Precision Sports-Antipolo won against UE Manila-Cherrylume Lady Red Warriors in 3 sets to claim the championship title. KMS-Quezon City Lady Vikings secured the bronze after outlasted Imus City-AJAA Lady Spikers in 5 sets.

Participating teams
8 teams entered the 2022 PNVF Champions League.

Format 
The following format will be conducted for the entirety of the conference:
Preliminary Round
 Single-round robin preliminaries; 8 teams; 2 pools; Teams are ranked using the FIVB Ranking System.
 The top two teams in each pool are qualified for the semifinal round
Semifinal round
 A1 vs. B2
 B1 vs. A2
Finals
 Bronze medal: SF1 Loser vs SF2 Loser
 Gold medal: SF1 Winner vs SF2 Winner

Venue

Pools composition
The 8 teams were divided into 4 teams in each pool.

Preliminary round
 All times are Philippine Standard Time (UTC+8:00).

Pool A

|}

|}

Pool B

|}

|}

Final round
 All times are Philippines Standard Time (UTC+08:00)

Semifinals 
|}

3rd place match 
|}

Championship 
|}

Final standing

Awards

Most Valuable Player
 Casiey Dongallo (California Precision Sports-Antipolo)
Best Setter
 Gyzelle Sy (Imus City-AJAA Lady Spikers)
Best Outside Spikers
 Janeca Lana (UE Manila-Cherrylume Lady Red Warriors)
 Casiey Dongallo (California Precision Sports-Antipolo)

Best Middle Blockers
 Jenalyn Umayam (California Precision Sports-Antipolo)
 Riza Nogales (UE Manila-Cherrylume Lady Red Warriors)
Best Opposite Spiker
 Jelai Gajero (California Precision Sports-Antipolo)
Best Libero
 Jellie Tempiatura (KMS-Quezon City Lady Vikings)

See also
2022 PNVF Champions League for Men

References

PNVF Champions League
C
C
C